Hilton Township is a township in Iowa County, Iowa, USA.

History
Hilton Township was established in 1858.

References

Townships in Iowa County, Iowa
Townships in Iowa
1858 establishments in Iowa